Jesper Normann Daland (born 6 January 2000) is a Norwegian professional footballer who plays as a defender for Belgian First Division A club Cercle Brugge.

Club career
Daland signed with Start before the 2019 season. A knee injury ruined his entire first season at the club, which meant that he only made his league debut for the club on 17 June 2020 in a 2–2 draw against Strømsgodset. Four days later, he scored his first league goal in a 2–2 draw against Sandefjord. His strong performances during the 2020 season meant that he was awarded the IK Start Young Player of the Year award in January 2021.

In May 2021, Daland signed a four-year contract with Belgian First Division A club Cercle Brugge. He made his debut as a starter on 24 July 2021 in a match against Beerschot which was interrupted after 55 minutes due to heavy rainfall. The match was continued on 27 July, and ended in a 1–0 win for Cercle.

Career statistics

Club

References

2000 births
Living people
Sportspeople from Kristiansand
Norwegian footballers
Norwegian expatriate footballers
Norway youth international footballers
Association football forwards
FK Vigør players
Stabæk Fotball players
IK Start players
Cercle Brugge K.S.V. players
Eliteserien players
Belgian Pro League players
Expatriate footballers in Belgium
Norwegian expatriate sportspeople in Belgium